Saint-Denis is a commune in the Gard department in southern France. It is around 15 km north-east of Alès.

Population

See also
Communes of the Gard department

References

Communes of Gard